Marko Samardžić ( born February 22, 1983, in Belgrade, SR Serbia, Yugoslavia) is a former Serbian volleyball player (libero). He was a member of the national team at the 2008 Summer Olympics in Beijing.

Career 
 2000–05  OK Crvena Zvezda
 2005–07  OK Vojvodina
 2007–08  Tours VB
 2008–09  Trefl Gdańsk
 2009–12  Aris

External links
 Marko Samardžić  - Sports-Reference.com
 Marko Samardžić - volley trend

Living people
1983 births
Sportspeople from Belgrade
Serbian men's volleyball players
Olympic volleyball players of Serbia
Volleyball players at the 2008 Summer Olympics
Serbia and Montenegro men's volleyball players
Serbian expatriate sportspeople in France
Serbian expatriate sportspeople in Poland
Serbian expatriate sportspeople in Greece
Serbian expatriate sportspeople in Romania
Serbian expatriate sportspeople in Switzerland